Traffic was the name of two ships of the White Star Line:

Ship names
cs:SS Traffic (1911)
es:SS Traffic